Spadina, originating from the Ojibwa  word ishpadinaa meaning "high place/ridge", may refer to:

Toronto, Ontario, Canada
Spadina House, a mansion and museum
Spadina Hotel (built 1873), a historic building
Spadina Avenue, a major street
Spadina Expressway, a partially completed highway
Spadina streetcar line (1923–48)
510 Spadina, a streetcar route
Yonge-University-Spadina Line (TTC), the Spadina line; a subway line
Spadina (TTC), a subway station on the Yonge-University Spadina and Bloor-Danforth lines
Spadina–Front GO Station, aka Spadina (GO), a commuter rail station
CNR Spadina Roundhouse, a railroad roundhouse
Spadina (electoral district) (1935–1988), a federal electoral district
Trinity—Spadina, a federal electoral district (1988–2015)
Trinity—Spadina (provincial electoral district), a provincial electoral district (since 1999) 
Spadina—Fort York, a federal (since 2012) electoral district
Spadina—Fort York (provincial electoral district)

Other uses
 Spadina Crescent Bridge (Saskatoon), Saskatchewan, Canada

See also

Ishpatina Ridge, Ontario's highest point and shares the same etymology as Spadina
1 Spadina Crescent (University of Toronto), Toronto, Ontario, Canada
Spadina streetcar line (disambiguation)